Keshavarz Qazvin Futsal Club (Persian: باشگاه فوتسال کشاورز قزوین) was an Iranian professional Futsal club based in Qazvin.

History 
The club was originally known as Felamingo Qazvin. In the half season of 2007–08 Iranian Futsal Super League it was renamed Poushineh Baft Qazvin due to change of sponsorship. Did not participate in the 2010-11 due to financial problems and lack of sponsorship. in the 2011–12 Iran Futsal's 1st Division they were renamed again to Heyat Football Qazvin. In the 2013–14 Iran Futsal's 1st Division it was renamed Keshavarz Qazvin due to change of sponsorship.

Season-by-season 
The table below chronicles the achievements of the Club in various competitions.

Last updated: May 2, 2021

References 

Futsal clubs in Iran
Sport in Qazvin